The Saskatoon Valkyries are a women's football team in the Western Women's Canadian Football League competing in the Prairie Conference. Of note, the team was undefeated in its first two regular seasons and have claimed the first four WWCFL championships in league history. The current head coach is Jeff Yausie and the team manager is Michelle Duchene. Games are contested at SMF field (formerly  Gordie Howe Bowl)

Year by year

IFAF competitors
The following recognizes women from the Saskatoon Valkyries that competed in the IFAF Women's World Football Championships

2010
 Jessie Buydens
 Julie Paetsch

2013
Jessie Buydens
Julie David
Marci Kiselyk
Jaime Lammerding
Darla Lee-Walde
  Julie Paetsch
Carisa Polischuk
 Elizabeth Thomson
Beth Thompson
Kendra Wilson

Awards and honors
Julie Paetsch, Most Outstanding Offensive Player, 2011 WWCFL title game

References

Canadian football
Sport in Western Canada
Women's sports in Canada
Canadian football teams in Saskatchewan
Sports clubs established in 2011
2011 establishments in Saskatchewan
Sport in Saskatoon
Women in Saskatchewan